Henry Brodribb Irving may refer to:

Henry Irving, actor, 1838 - 1905
Harry Brodribb Irving, actor, his son, 1870 - 1919